The 2020 FIBA Men's Olympic Qualifying Tournaments includes teams whose rosters consists of 12 players; a team may opt to have one naturalized player as per FIBA eligibility rules in their roster. 

Player ages are as of 29 June 2021, the first day of the tournament.

OQT Victoria, Canada

Canada

Greece 
Roster.

Czech Republic

Turkey 
Roster for the 2020 FIBA Men's Olympic Qualifying Tournaments.

China

Uruguay

OQT Split, Croatia

Croatia

Russia

Brazil

Germany

Mexico

Tunisia

OQT Kaunas, Lithuania

Lithuania

Poland

Slovenia

Venezuela

South Korea

Angola

OQT Belgrade, Serbia

Serbia 

The following is the Serbia roster for the Olympic Qualifying Tournament.

Italy

Puerto Rico

Dominican Republic

Philippines 
The following is the Philippines' final roster for the Olympic Qualifying Tournament which was announced on 24 June 2021.

References

Squads
Men's Olympic basketball squads